Andrija Balajić (born 22 August 1972) is a Croatian former football defender, who last played for Austrian amateur side USV Markt Hartmannsdorf.

Club career
He spent the majority of his career at Varteks, with short spells in Portugal, Israel and Greece, as well as playing briefly for Croatian giants Hajduk Split in the 2003–04 season.

International career
He made his debut for Croatia in a March 1996 friendly match against Israel, coming on as a 46th-minute substitute in for Milan Rapaić, and earned a total of 3 caps scoring no goals. His final international was a June 1997 Kirin Cup match against Japan.

References

External links
Croatia stats at Croatian Football Federation website 
Profile at Nogometni Magazin 
 

1972 births
Living people
People from Sinj
Association football defenders
Croatian footballers
Croatia international footballers
NK Varaždin players
Sporting CP footballers
Hapoel Be'er Sheva F.C. players
F.C. Ashdod players
HNK Hajduk Split players
Levadiakos F.C. players
Trikala F.C. players
Croatian Football League players
Primeira Liga players
Liga Leumit players
Israeli Premier League players
Gamma Ethniki players
Football League (Greece) players
Croatian expatriate footballers
Expatriate footballers in Portugal
Croatian expatriate sportspeople in Portugal
Expatriate footballers in Israel
Croatian expatriate sportspeople in Israel
Expatriate footballers in Greece
Croatian expatriate sportspeople in Greece
Expatriate footballers in Slovenia
Croatian expatriate sportspeople in Slovenia
Expatriate footballers in Austria
Croatian expatriate sportspeople in Austria
Shanghai Shenhua F.C. non-playing staff